Joshua David Heard (born 29 November 1994) is a Welsh professional footballer who plays as an attacking midfielder for Pacific FC of the Canadian Premier League.

Early life
Heard was born in Cardiff, Wales and moved to Victoria, Canada when he was three. Heard played youth soccer with Lakehill Soccer Association. He also played for Victoria Metro and the Victoria Highlanders. He had been invited to train with the Vancouver Whitecaps Academy, but he elected to attend college and play college soccer instead.

College career
In 2012, Heard  began attending the University of Washington, where he played for the men's soccer team. He had been recruited to the school after impressing the team's coaching staff when they saw him playing in a youth match, which they were attending to watch two members of the opposing team who had committed to joining Washington. He made his debut on August 24, 2012 against the Gonzaga Bulldogs. On September 22, 2013, he scored his first collegiate goal against the Georgia State Panthers. On October 8, 2013, he scored a brace in a 2-0 victory over the Seattle Redhawks. In 2013, Washington won the 2013 Pac-12 title and advance to the Elite Eight of the NCAA National Tournament. In his senior season, he was named an Honourable Mention for the All-Pac 12 All-Star Teams. After the season, he was invited to the MLS Player Combine ahead of the 2016 MLS SuperDraft, however, he was not able to attend due to injury. Over his time with Washington, he scored 13 goals and added eight assists in 74 games.

Club career
In 2011 and 2012, Heard played with the Victoria Highlanders in the Premier Development League. In 2013, he signed with the North Sound SeaWolves, before returning to the Highlanders, helping them reach the PDL Final Four in 2013. In 2014, he signed with the newly renamed Puget Sound Gunners (who changed their name from the North Sound SeaWovles) again.

In January 2016, Heard was selected 71st overall in the 2016 MLS SuperDraft by Vancouver Whitecaps FC. However, he did not sign with the Whitecaps.

In late January 2016, he signed a professional contract with USL club Bethlehem Steel FC. He made his debut on April 11, 2016 against New York Red Bulls II. He scored his first goal on July 7, 2016 against Toronto FC II. He departed the club after the 2017 season, upon the expiry of his contract.

In February 2018, he signed with the Real Monarchs of the USL. He scored his first goal on May 19, 2018 against the Las Vegas Lights. After the season, the club picked up his option for the following season. In July 2019, he was sent on a one year loan to Austrian club FC Pinzgau Saalfelden until July 2020. With Pinzgau, they qualified for the promotion playoff series, but it was cancelled due to the COVID-19 pandemic in March 2020. Upon the conclusion of his loan, he departed the Monarchs, mutually terminating the deal, after being unable to return to the United States due to COVID-19 pandemic travel restrictions.

On 31 July 2020, he signed with Pacific FC of the Canadian Premier League. On August 15, he made his debut for Pacific against the HFX Wanderers. He won the 2021 CPL Championship with Pacific. In January 2022, he re-signed with the club for an additional season. On August 2, 2022, he scored two goals in a 6-0 CONCACAF League victory over Jamaican club Waterhouse FC to help Pacific advance to the Round of 16. In November 2022, it was announced that he would return to the club for the 2023 season. He was named team captain ahead of the 2023 season.

Honours

Club
Pacific FC
Canadian Premier League: 2021

References

External links 
 
 
 Josh Heard at SoccerStats

1994 births
Living people
Association football midfielders
Canadian soccer players
Welsh footballers
Footballers from Cardiff
Soccer players from Victoria, British Columbia
Welsh emigrants to Canada
Naturalized citizens of Canada
Canadian expatriate soccer players
Welsh expatriate footballers
Expatriate soccer players in the United States
Canadian expatriate sportspeople in the United States
Welsh expatriate sportspeople in the United States
Expatriate footballers in Austria
Canadian expatriate sportspeople in Austria
Welsh expatriate sportspeople in Austria
Washington Huskies men's soccer players
Victoria Highlanders players
Puget Sound Gunners FC players
Vancouver Whitecaps FC draft picks
Philadelphia Union II players
Real Monarchs players
Pacific FC players
USL League Two players
USL Championship players
Austrian Regionalliga players
Canadian Premier League players